Dave J. Browne is a game designer who has worked primarily on role-playing games.

Career
Dave Browne and Don Turnbull wrote the early TSR UK adventures U1-U3 (1981–1983), which added to the Greyhawk setting. He also wrote the adventure Beyond the Crystal Cave (1983) with Tom Kirby and Graeme Morris.

References

External links
 

Dungeons & Dragons game designers
Living people
Place of birth missing (living people)
Year of birth missing (living people)